Sir (Reginald) Michael Hadow  (17 August 1915 – 22 December 1993) was a British diplomat. He was Ambassador to Israel from 1965 to 1969, and Ambassador to Argentina from 1969 to 1972.

References

External links
  Obituary for Sir Michael Hadow

Ambassadors of the United Kingdom to Argentina
Ambassadors of the United Kingdom to Israel
Knights Commander of the Order of St Michael and St George
1915 births
1993 deaths